The Saints Peter and Paul Church is a Roman Catholic church in Livno, Bosnia and Herzegovina.

References 

Livno
Roman Catholic churches in Livno
Roman Catholic churches completed in 1906
Saint Peter
1906 establishments in Austria-Hungary
20th-century Roman Catholic church buildings in Bosnia and Herzegovina
History of Livno